Murder in Arizona constitutes the intentional killing, under circumstances defined by law, of people within or under the jurisdiction of the U.S. state of Arizona.

In Arizona, a person is charged with murder when the offender knowingly and intentionally causes the death of a person or unborn child. The murder must be premeditated. In the state of Arizona, if one is found guilty of first-degree murder, there is the possibility of receiving the death penalty.

The United States Centers for Disease Control and Prevention reported that in the year 2020, the state had a murder rate near the median for the entire country.

Felony murder rule

Arizona abolished all common law criminal concepts and replaced them with criminal statutes. The felony murder rule survives in Arizona by current statutory law. The felony murder rule holds that a killing of a person occurring in the course of, or in the immediate flight from, the commission of the following crimes is considered murder in the first degree:
 Sexual Conduct with a minor
 Sexual Assault
 Molestation of a child
 Terrorism
 Marijuana offenses
 Dangerous drug offenses
 Narcotics offenses
 The use of minors in drug offenses
 Drive by shooting
 Kidnapping
 Burglary
 Arson
 Robbery
 Escape
 Child abuse
 Unlawful flight from a pursuing law enforcement vehicle
A person convicted of murder in the first degree faces possible sentences of life imprisonment or, when aggravating factors exist, the death penalty. Except, if the defendant was under 18, they are given a 25 or 35 years-to-Life sentence, but Life imprisonment remains in the books.

Penalties
Source:

References

Murder in Arizona
Arizona law
U.S. state criminal law